Lisette Melendez (born 1967) is an American freestyle/Latin pop/dance-pop singer. She is best known for her Top 40 hit "Together Forever", which reached No. 35 on the Billboard Hot 100 in 1991, and its follow-up "A Day In My Life (Without You)", which peaked at No. 49. Both songs were dance music hits and are credited as helping renew interest in Freestyle music in the early 1990s, which had been fading in popularity due to the drop in mainstream pop music and rise of grunge at the time.

Early life
Melendez was born and raised in East Harlem, New York. Melendez's childhood inspirations include her mother and aunt, who sang in a church choir and community theater. She honed her singing voice in her teenage years through emulating Barbra Streisand and Bette Midler. In high school she became a fan of Puerto Rican freestyle music singer Lisa Lisa who had many dance hits. Melendez, also of Puerto Rican descent, was inspired by Lisa Lisa's success.

Career
Melendez got her break in 1988 and sang backing vocals for a track by dance music record producer Carlos Berrios, who had also worked with Sweet Sensation and Samantha Fox. A few years of dance club touring eventually led to the recording of the single "Together Forever" Produced By Carlos Berrios and Platinum Producer Frankie Cutlass, and soon after a full album with Fever/Columbia Records.

1990s
Four more albums followed, including her second album True to Life in 1994, which included the Billboard Hot 100 hit "Goody Goody" (No. 53) as well as "Will You Ever Save Me" which reached No. 38 on the Rhythmic Top 40 chart. The album was both a commercial and critical success in Japan. In 1998, she released her third album, Un Poco De Mi, a salsa album sung in Spanish. It scored a hit with "Algo de Mi", which peaked at No. 8 on the Latin Tropical/Salsa Airplay chart and No. 23 on the Hot Latin Tracks chart. Her fourth album, released later in 1998, was Imagination. The lead single was "Time Passes By", but it did not gain the radio airplay and success of her previous singles.

2000s
Melendez teamed up with fellow freestyle singer Cynthia in 2005, releasing the single "I Can't Change Your Mind" as the duo Liscyn. She continues to tour as of 2006.

Melendez teamed up with famed music producer Carlos "After Dark" Berrios in 2008, performing two new tracks "I Need a Lover" and "Don't Ever Say" on albums Don't Look Back Sessions One & Two.

Melendez also performed at the I Love Freestyle Vol. 1 Live Concert event on January 17, 2015, at the Resorts World Casino in Buffalo, New York, along with fellow freestyle artists Jade Starling, Sa-Fire, Lisa Lisa and others.

Discography

Studio albums

Singles 
 1988: "Make Noise"
 1990: "If You Truly Love Me"
 1990: "Together Forever"
 1990-1991 "Stranger (In my House of Love)"
 1991: "A Day in My Life (Without You)"
 1991: "Never Say Never"
 1993: "Goody Goody"
 1994: "Will You Ever Save Me"
 1996: "Time Passes By"
 1998: "Algo De Mi"
 1998: "Make the Way"
 2002 "Stay" (under Lelah Paine)
 2005: "I Can't Change Your Mind"
 2018: "Rise"

Videos

See also
 List of Puerto Ricans
 Nuyorican
 Puerto Ricans in New York City

References

External links
 Lisette Melendez on MySpace
 Lisette Melendez on Discogs

1967 births
Living people
American dance musicians
American freestyle musicians
American musicians of Puerto Rican descent
American women pop singers
American Latin pop singers
Singers from New York City
Spanish-language singers of the United States
People from East Harlem